Ramosmania rodriguesi, commonly known as café marron, is a tree native to the Mauritian island of Rodrigues in the Indian Ocean. Its French common name  translates to "brown coffee."

History
It was thought Ramosmania rodriguesi was extinct until a single surviving tree was spotted by a schoolboy in 1979, who was shown a drawing of the plant by his teacher. The only image of the plant was made in 1877, by a European visitor, passing through Rodrigues. By the 1950s, it was presumed to be extinct. In the 1970s, a specimen was discovered; cuttings were taken to Kew Gardens, and although the plant regularly flowered, it never produced seed until horticulturist Carlos Magdalena discovered how to make the male plant bear female flowers.

Ramosmania rodriguesi was assessed as a Critically Endangered species in 1998.

In 2003, the café marron bore its first fruit with viable seeds. Slow but steady efforts have been made to grow more café marron trees and speed up the pollination process. 

In 2010, there were 300 successfully germinated seeds in Rodrigues, spreading hope that the species can eventually exist in the wild once again.

Taxonomy 
R. rodriguesi is in the same Rubiaceae family as the now extinct R. heterophylla which used to reside on Rodrigues. D.D. Tirvengadum originally thought that R. heterophylla and R. rodriguesi were the same species, until he noted that the shape of the R. rodriguesi leaves were "elliptic obtuse" in comparison to those of R. heterophylla.

Life cycle 
Moths pollinate the plant while Rodrigues flying foxes spread the seeds. These pollinators are less endangered than R. rodriguesi, therefore their absence is not expected to be a problem when the species is reintroduced to Rodrigues. R. rodriguesi's female flowers develop after male flowers, indicating that the plant is protandrous. The appearances of the young plant and its adult counterpart are drastically different, likely meant to deter predators from eating the young plant before it matures and reproduces. The species is also heterophyllous, meaning that they have both young leaves growing at the bottom of the plant while there are adult leaves on the top half of the plant.

Appearance 
Young R. rodriguesi leaves have obtuse, rounded apexes while mature leaves have rounded, almost truncated apexes. The petals' tube is funnel-shaped and leathery with a length of 1 centimeter. The plant's fruit is thin and elongated. Additionally, R. rodriguesi have smooth midribs as opposed to their hairy counterpart, R. heterophylla.

Threats 
The species' most prevalent threats are predators, poaching, pests, and habitat loss. Giant tortoises are R. rodriguesi's primary predator and they feast on young, low-hanging leaves. Researchers hypothesized that in response to the predation of giant tortoises, the species' young leaves evolved to appear darker and therefore less appealing or visible to the tortoises. Other notable predators are the dodo-descendant, Rodrigues solitaire, and goats. Poaching is also extremely damaging to the species. The urban legend associated with the plant contributed significantly to the amount of poaching because people wanted to use the plant to cure their hangovers and liver diseases. Mealybugs are known pests for R. rodriguesi and they do not harm the plant unless they become infested, which disrupts development.

Conditions 
R. rodriguesi can only survive in tropical temperatures of 19-23 °C with 70-80% humidity. The plants do not have a preference for shade or light, though flowering occurs more so when shaded.

Urban legend 
Many locals of Rodrigues subscribed to the belief that R. rodriguesi had the potential to remedy venereal diseases and cure hangovers. This is how the plant gained its nickname, . Subsequently, many people cut pieces from the plant and inhibited its further cultivation, which turned out to be a considerable factor in the species' endangerment.

References

External links 
 Kew Gardens: Cafe marron

Octotropideae
Critically endangered plants
Endemic flora of Rodrigues
Plants described in 1989
Taxobox binomials not recognized by IUCN